HMS G8 was a G-class submarine of the Royal Navy that saw service during World War I, costing an estimated £125,000.

Description
The G-class submarines were designed by the Admiralty in response to a rumour that the Germans were building double-hulled submarines for overseas duties. They displaced  on the surface and  submerged. The G-class submarines had a crew of 30 officers and ratings. They had a partial double hull.

For surface running, the boats were powered by two  Vickers two-stroke diesel engines, each driving one propeller shaft. When submerged each propeller was driven by a  electric motor. They could reach  on the surface and  underwater.

The boats were intended to be armed with one 21-inch (53.3 cm) torpedo tube in the bow and two 18-inch (45 cm) torpedo tubes on the beam. This was revised, however, while they were under construction, the 21-inch tube was moved to the stern and two additional 18-inch tubes were added in the bow. They carried two 21-inch and eight 18-inch torpedoes. The G-class submarines were also armed with a single  deck gun.

War service

Like the rest of her class, G8s role was to patrol the North Sea in search of German submarines.

G8 belonged to the 10th Flotilla during her war service, but also operated out of Scapa Flow during most of 1917. Her patrol areas were from north of Shetland to Norway, the Skagerrak, the Kattegat, and the Horns Reef. She also made one patrol out of Harwich for the 9th Flotilla in August 1916 before joining the Tees Flotilla.

Her last patrol began from Tees on 27 December 1917, leaving with the submarine  and the destroyer  for the Kattegat. She was ordered to start her voyage back on 3 January 1918 or possibly 48 hours later, returning to Tees on or around 6 January 1918. She did not return and was never heard from again. She was officially declared missing on 14 January 1918. The cause remains unknown, but she was found with depth rudders pointing towards the surface, which suggests that the men aboard were trying to get to the surface. Therefore, it is thought that a technical error led to the sinking. There is no evidence on the wreck of it being hit by torpedoes or mines.

Discovery and salvage
The wreck was found in 2019 by the Danish "Sea War Museum Jutland" while they were in the process of registering all wrecks in Danish sea territories "Kattegat" and "Skagerak". It rests on approximately 100 m. of water. There are no plans of recovering the wreck.

References

 

 

British G-class submarines
World War I submarines of the United Kingdom
Ships built in Barrow-in-Furness
Royal Navy ship names
1916 ships
Maritime incidents in 1918
World War I shipwrecks in the North Sea